Patrick Keary Jerel Colbert (born May 21, 1982) is an American football coach and former player who is the wide receivers coach for the Denver Broncos of the National Football League (NFL).

Colbert played as a wide receiver and was drafted by the Carolina Panthers in the second round of the 2004 NFL Draft. He also played for the Denver Broncos, Seattle Seahawks, Detroit Lions, Florida Tuskers, Sacramento Mountain Lions, and Kansas City Chiefs. He played college football at USC.

Early years
Colbert attended Hueneme High School in Oxnard, California, and was a letterman in football and track. He also lettered in basketball as a sophomore. Colbert also attended Sunkist Elementary and E.O. Green Junior High School. He played football as a youth for the Port Hueneme Rhinos.

College career
He attended University of Southern California, where he was a star wide receiver.  In his final year at USC (2003), Colbert made an unbelievable catch while he was interfered by a defender in the Rose Bowl against University of Michigan, broke away and walked into the end zone for a touchdown.  Colbert's 149 yards in the Rose Bowl were a career-high.  The effort helped USC capture the AP National Championship.  Colbert caught at least one pass in his final 36 games, and left USC as the school's all-time leader in pass receptions, passing Kareem Kelly with 207. He earned All-Pac-10 second-team honors his senior year and finished second on the team with 69 receptions for 1,013 yards and nine touchdowns.

Professional career

Carolina Panthers
Colbert was the Carolina Panthers' second round pick in the 2004 NFL Draft.  With the Panthers, he stepped into the 2nd receiver spot when Steve Smith was injured. He filled in nicely, with 47 catches for 754 yards and 5 touchdowns. On Oct 10, Colbert recorded 4 receptions for 115 yards and a touchdown against the Denver Broncos, setting a franchise rookie record with 28.7 yards/reception.

With high expectations for Colbert in the 2005 season, he struggled catching 25 passes for 282 yards and just 2 touchdowns. In 2006, Colbert was often inactive late in the season, and following a mediocre 2007 campaign, was placed on injured reserve.

Denver Broncos
On March 1, 2008, he signed with the Denver Broncos to a three-year, $7.2 million contract, including a $2.5 million signing bonus.

Seattle Seahawks
On September 16, 2008, Colbert was acquired from the Denver Broncos by the Seattle Seahawks for a conditional fifth-round pick in the 2009 NFL Draft. Colbert was released by the Seahawks on November 11.

Detroit Lions
Colbert was signed by the Detroit Lions on December 1, 2008 after wide receiver Mike Furrey was placed on injured reserve. On May 7, 2009, he was resigned to the Lions for the 2009 season. On September 5, 2009, he was cut from the team.

Sacramento Mountain Lions
On June 12, 2011, Colbert signed with the Sacramento Mountain Lions of the United Football League.

Kansas City Chiefs
On August 10, 2011, Colbert signed with the Kansas City Chiefs of the National Football League. He was waived on November 23.

Coaching career

First stint at USC
In 2010, Colbert was hired as the assistant tight ends coach at USC, a position he held for only one season.

Georgia State
In 2013, Colbert was the assistant wide receivers coach at Georgia State.

Alabama
Colbert served as the offensive analyst at Alabama during their 2014 and 2015 seasons. He helped the Crimson Tide win two SEC titles and a national championship in 2015 season

Second stint at USC
In 2016, Colbert returned to the USC coaching staff as an offensive analyst. In 2018 Colbert became the tight ends coach. In 2019 Colbert became the receivers coach.

Florida
On December 15, 2021, Colbert was named as wide receivers coach at Florida, joining the staff of first year head coach Billy Napier.

References

External links

Denver Broncos bio
Detroit Lions bio
USC Trojans bio

1982 births
Living people
Sportspeople from Oxnard, California
American football wide receivers
USC Trojans football players
Carolina Panthers players
Denver Broncos players
Seattle Seahawks players
Detroit Lions players
Florida Tuskers players
Kansas City Chiefs players
Georgia State Panthers football coaches
Sportspeople from Ventura County, California